Abdullah Saleh 'Abdul Hadi Salim (born 25 April 1992) is an Omani footballer who plays as a striker for Oman Professional League club Al-Oruba SC.

International career

Youth 
Abdullah started his career with the Oman national under-23 football team in 2010 when Oman participated in the 2010 Asian Games. He scored only one goal in the tournament in a 3-0 win over Maldives in the Group Stage. Oman lost 1-0 to Iran in the quarter-finals.

In 2012, he helped his team to qualify for the first edition of the AFC U-22 Championship, the 2013 AFC U-22 Championship as the best third-placed team although later Oman earned an automatic qualification to the tournament as the host nation. In the 2013 AFC U-22 Championship qualification he scored two goals, one in a 3-2 win over Lebanon and another in a 3-1 win over Turkmenistan. In the final tournament, Abdullah played in three matches but failed to score a single goal. In the tournament, Oman won three points in a 4-0 win over Myanmar. Oman failed to qualify for the quarter-finals.

Senior 
Abdullah was selected for the national team for the first time in 2012. He made his first appearance for Oman on 8 December 2012 against Lebanon in the 2012 WAFF Championship. He has made appearances in the 2012 WAFF Championship, the 2014 FIFA World Cup qualification, the 2013 Gulf Cup of Nations and the 2014 WAFF Championship.

Career statistics

Club

International 
Scores and results list Oman's goal tally first.

Honours
Al-Oruba
Sultan Qaboos Cup: 2010
Oman Super Cup: 2011
Omani League runner-up: 2010–11

References

External links
 
 
 
 Abdullah Abdul-Hadi at Goal.com
 
 

1992 births
Living people
Omani footballers
Oman international footballers
Association football forwards
Al-Orouba SC players
Oman Professional League players
Footballers at the 2010 Asian Games
Asian Games competitors for Oman
People from Sur, Oman